Captain Elam Lynds (1784–1855) was a prison warden. He helped create the Auburn system, which consisted of congregate labor during the day and isolation at night, starting in 1821 and was Warden of Sing Sing from 1825 to 1830.

Early life
Elam Lynds was born in Litchfield, Connecticut in 1784. His parents moved to Troy, New York, when he was an infant. He learned the hatter's trade and worked at it for some years.

War of 1812 service
In the War of 1812 he held a captain's commission in a New York regiment.

Auburn State Prison
The Auburn State Prison's South Wing was opened in the Spring of 1817, and fifty-three prisoners were transferred there from nearby counties. Lynds was made the first principal keeper, and four years afterwards he became Warden of Auburn State Prison.

Lynds devised the main features of the Auburn System of imprisonment.   When Lynds took charge of Auburn in 1821, he felt that discipline was lax, with guards only interested in preventing escape. Lynds, believing that chaining prisoners in a dungeon failed to produce "a good state of discipline," resorted exclusively to beatings. Speaking in 1826 to visiting commissioners, Lynds explained:

In 1821, locals rioted to protest the inmates' treatment. Even his own staff objected to Lynds's brutal methods. In spring 1821, keepers refused to flog a prisoner.  The keepers were fired and a blacksmith named Jonathan Thompson carried out the flogging. When Thompson left the prison, he was tarred and feathered by a crowd.  Henry Hall, in The History of Auburn (1861), described the scene:

Retirement and death
After his retirement from the prison service he lived in New York City, where he died in 1855.

Notes

References 

Wardens of Sing Sing
Wardens of the Auburn Correctional Facility
1784 births
1855 deaths
Tarring and feathering in the United States